European Americans (also referred to as Euro-Americans) are Americans of European ancestry. This term includes people who are descended from the first European settlers in the United States as well as people who are descended from more recent European arrivals. European Americans have been the largest panethnic group in the United States since about the 17th century.

The Spaniards are thought to be the first Europeans to establish a continuous presence in what is now the contiguous United States, with Martín de Argüelles ( 1566) in St. Augustine, then a part of Spanish Florida, and the Russians were the first Europeans to settle in Alaska, establishing Russian America. The first English child born in the Americas was Virginia Dare, born August 18, 1587. She was born in Roanoke Colony, located in present-day North Carolina, which was the first attempt, made by Queen Elizabeth I, to establish a permanent English settlement in North America.

In the 2016 American Community Survey, German Americans (13%), Irish Americans (12%), English Americans (9%), Italian Americans (6%), and Polish Americans (3%) were the five largest self-reported European ancestry groups in the United States, forming over a third of the total population. However, the number of people with British ancestry is considered to be significantly under-counted, as many people in that demographic tend to identify themselves simply as Americans (20,151,829 or 7.2%). The same applies to Americans of Spanish ancestry, as many people in that demographic tend to identify themselves as Hispanic and Latino Americans (58,846,134 or 16.6%), even though they carry a mean of 65.1% European genetic ancestry, mainly from Spain. In the 2000 census over 56 million or 19.9% of the United States population ignored the ancestry question and are classified as "unspecified" and "not reported".

Terminology

Use 
In 1995, as part of a review of the Office of Management and Budget's Statistical Policy Directive No. 15 (Race and Ethnic Standards for Federal Statistics and Administrative Reporting), a survey was conducted of census recipients to determine their preferred terminology for the racial/ethnic groups defined in the Directive. For the White group, European American came a distant third, preferred by only 2.35% of panel interviewees, as opposed to White, which was preferred by 61.66%.

The term is sometimes used interchangeably with Caucasian American, White American, and Anglo American in many places around the United States. However, the terms Caucasian and White are racial terms, not geographic, and include some populations whose origin is outside of Europe; and Anglo-American also has another definition, meaning Americans with English ancestry.

Origin 
The term is used by some to emphasize this demographic's European cultural and geographical as well as ancestral origins, parallelling terms such as African Americans and Asian Americans.

In contexts such as medical research, terms such as "white" and "European" have been criticized for vagueness and blurring important distinctions between different groups that happen to fit within the label. Margo Adair suggests that viewing Americans of European descent as a single group contributes to the "Wonder breading" of the United States, eradicating the cultural heritage of individual European ethnicities.

Subgroups 
There are a number of subgroupings of European Americans. While these categories may be approximately defined, often due to the imprecise or cultural regionalization of Europe, the subgroups are nevertheless used widely in cultural or ethnic identification. This is particularly the case in diasporic populations, as with European people in the United States generally. In alphabetical order, some of the subgroups are:
 Northwestern European Americans, including Austrian Americans, Belgian Americans, British Americans (Cornish Americans, English Americans, Manx Americans, Scotch-Irish Americans, Scottish Americans, Welsh Americans), Dutch Americans, French Americans, German Americans, Irish Americans, Luxembourgish Americans, Scandinavian Americans (Danish Americans, Finnish Americans, Icelandic Americans, Norwegian Americans, Swedish Americans) and Swiss Americans, or "Old Immigrants" (the first waves of which arrived pre-1881)
 Eastern European Americans, including Belarusian Americans, Czech Americans, Estonian Americans, Hungarian Americans, Latvian Americans, Lithuanian Americans, Polish Americans, Russian Americans, Slovak Americans, and Ukrainian Americans, or "New Immigrants" (the first large waves of which arrived 1881-1965)
 Southern European Americans, including Albanian Americans, Bosnian Americans, Bulgarian Americans, Croatian Americans, Cypriot Americans, Greek Americans, Italian Americans, Kosovan Americans, Maltese Americans, Macedonian Americans, Moldovan Americans, Montenegrin Americans, Portuguese Americans, Romanian Americans, Serbian Americans, Slovenian Americans, and Spanish Americans (Asturian Americans, Basque Americans, Canarian Americans, Catalan Americans, Galician Americans), also "New Immigrants" (the first large waves of which arrived 1881-1965)

History 

Before the arrival of Europeans in the United States, the Native Americans predominantly inhabited the United States. The Native Americans died of European diseases such as small pox. Europeans killed an estimated 90% of Native Americans. The first Europeans to invade North America were the Spanish. The Spanish’s first invasion was in 1565 at St. Augustine, Florida. The most significant early explorers was from Spain Hernando De Soto, a Spanish explorer and conquistador who had accompanied Spanish conquistador Francisco Pizzaro during the his conquest of Peru. Leaving Havana, Cuba in 1539, De Soto's expedition landed in the state of Florida and ranged through the southeastern area in the United States as far as the Mississippi River in search of riches and fortune. Another Spaniard who initially explored the United States, Francisco Coronado, set out from the country Mexico in 1540 in search of the mythical Seven Cities of Cibola. Coronado's had traveled to Kansas and the Grand Canyon, but had failed to reveal the gold or treasure his men were looking for. Coronado left a gift of horses to the Plains Indians. Italian explorer Giovanni da Verrazano and Frenchman Jacques Cartier are other Europeans who initially explored the United States. The Spanish, viewed the French as a threat to their trade route along the Gulf Stream.

Since 1607, some 57 million immigrants have come to the United States from other lands. Approximately 10 million passed through on their way to some other place or returned to their original homelands, leaving a net gain of some 47 million people.

Shifts in European migration
Before 1881, the vast majority of immigrants, almost 86% of the total, arrived from northwest Europe, principally Great Britain, Ireland, Germany, and Scandinavia, known as "Old Immigration". The years between 1881 and 1893 the pattern shifted, in the sources of U.S. "New Immigration".
Between 1894 and 1914, immigrants from southern, central, and eastern Europe accounted for 69% of the total. Prior to 1960, the overwhelming majority came from Europe or of European descent from Canada. Immigration from Europe as a proportion of new arrivals has been in decline since the mid-20th century, with 75.0% of the total foreign-born population born in Europe compared to 12.1% recorded in the 2010 census.

Immigration since 1820 

European-born population

The figures below show that of the total population of specified birthplace in the United States. A total of 11.1% were born-overseas of the total population.

Demographics 

The numbers below give numbers of European Americans as measured by the U.S. Census in 1980, 1990, and 2000. The numbers are measured according to declarations in census responses. This leads to uncertainty over the real meaning of the figures: For instance, as can be seen, according to these figures, the European American population dropped 40 million in ten years, but in fact, this is a reflection of changing census responses. In particular, it reflects the increased popularity of the "American" option following its inclusion as an example in the 2000 census forms.

Breakdowns of the European American population into sub-components is a difficult and rather arbitrary exercise. Farley (1991) argues that "because of ethnic intermarriage, the numerous generations that separate respondents from their forebears and the apparent unimportance to many whites of European origin, responses appear quite inconsistent".

In particular, a large majority of European Americans have ancestry from a number of different countries and the response to a single "ancestry" gives little indication of the backgrounds of Americans today. When only prompted for a single response, the examples given on the census forms and a pride in identifying the more distinctive parts of one's heritage are important factors; these will likely adversely affect the numbers reporting ancestries from the British Isles. Multiple response ancestry data often greatly increase the numbers reporting for the main ancestry groups, although Farley goes as far to conclude that "no simple question will distinguish those who identify strongly with a specific European group from those who report symbolic or imagined ethnicity." He highlights responses in the Current Population Survey (1973) where for the main "old" ancestry groups (e.g., German, Irish, English, and French), over 40% change their reported ancestry over the six-month period between survey waves (page 422).

The largest self-reported ancestries in 2000, reporting over 5 million members, were in order: German, Irish, English, American, Italian, French, and Polish. They have different distributions within the United States; in general, the northern half of the United States from Pennsylvania westward is dominated by German ancestry, and the southern-half by English and American. Irish may be found throughout the entire country. Italian ancestry is most common in the Northeast, Polish in the Great Lakes Region and the Northeast, and French in New England and Louisiana. U.S. Census Bureau statisticians estimate that approximately 62 percent of European Americans today are either wholly or partly of English, Welsh, Irish, or Scottish ancestry. Approximately 86% of European Americans today are of Northwestern and Central European ancestry, and 14% are of Southern European, Southeastern European, Eastern European, and Euro-Latino descent.

Ancestral origins

Culture 

As the largest component of the American population, the overall American culture deeply reflects the European-influenced culture that predates the United States of America as an independent state. Much of American culture shows influences from the diverse nations of the United Kingdom and Ireland, such as the English, Irish, Cornish, Manx, Scotch-Irish, Scottish and Welsh. Colonial ties to the United Kingdom spread the English language, legal system and other cultural attributes. Scholar David Hackett Fischer asserts in Albion's Seed: Four British Folkways in America that the folkways of four groups of people who moved from distinct regions of the United Kingdom to the United States persisted and provide a substantial cultural basis for much of the modern United States. Fischer explains "the origins and stability of a social system which for two centuries has remained stubbornly democratic in its politics, capitalist in its economy, libertarian in its laws and individualist in its society and pluralistic in its culture."

Much of the European-American cultural lineage can be traced back to Western and Northern Europe, which is institutionalized in the government, traditions, and civic education in the United States.
Since most later European Americans have assimilated into American culture, many Americans of European ancestry now generally express their personal ethnic ties sporadically and symbolically and do not consider their specific ethnic origins to be essential to their identity; however, European American ethnic expression has been revived since the 1960s. Some European Americans such as Italians, Greeks, Poles, Germans, Ukrainians, Irish, and others have maintained high levels of ethnic identity. In the 1960s, the melting pot ideal to some extent gave way to increased interest in cultural pluralism, strengthening affirmations of ethnic identity among various American ethnic groups, European as well as others.

Law 
The American legal system also has its roots in French philosophy with the separation of powers and the federal system along with English law in common law. For example, elements of the Magna Carta in it contain provisions on criminal law that were incorporated into the Bill of Rights of the U.S. Constitution.
It as well as other documents had elements influencing and incorporated into the United States Constitution.

Cuisine 

 Apple pie – New England was the first region to experience large-scale English colonization in the early 17th century, beginning in 1620, and it was dominated by East Anglian Calvinists, better known as the Puritans. Baking was a particular favorite of the New Englanders and was the origin of dishes seen today as quintessentially "American", such as apple pie and the oven-roasted Thanksgiving turkey, a bird that although not found in Europe has become linked in tradition and symbolism to the early European immigrants. "As American as apple pie" is a well-known phrase used to suggest that something is all-American.
 Hamburger – Although the origins of the hamburger, including the country in which it was first served, are subjects of debate, the hamburger first became widely marketed in the United States and has been internationally known for decades as a symbol of American fast food.
 Maxwell Street Polish Hot Dog – Consists of a grilled or fried length of Polish sausage topped with grilled onions and yellow mustard and optional pickled whole, green sport peppers, served on a bun. The sandwich traces its origins to Chicago's Maxwell Street market, and has been called one of "the classic foods synonymous with Chicago".
 Buffalo wings – Invented in 1964 at Anchor Bar in Buffalo, New York by Italian-American Teressa Bellissimo. Now popular all over the country, it has become a symbol of American cuisine.
 Hot dog – Hot dogs were brought to New York by German immigrants.
 Pizza – Italian immigrants from Naples brought pizza to the United States.
 Fried chicken – Scottish immigrants brought fried chicken to the Southern United States. Enslaved African Americans began cooking fried chicken based on the recipes from white Scottish slaveholders.

Thanksgiving 
 Thanksgiving – In the United States, it has become a national secular holiday (official since 1863) with religious origins. The first Thanksgiving was celebrated by English settlers to give thanks to God and the Native Americans for helping the Pilgrims of Plymouth Colony survive the brutal winter. The modern Thanksgiving holiday traces its origins from a 1621 celebration at the Plymouth Plantation, where the Plymouth settlers held a harvest feast with the Native Americans after a successful growing season. William Bradford is credited as the first to proclaim the American cultural event which is generally referred to as the "First Thanksgiving".

Sports 

 Baseball – The earliest recorded game of base-ball involved the family of the Prince of Wales, played indoors in London in November 1748. The Prince is reported as playing "Bass-Ball" again in September 1749 in Walton-on-Thames, Surrey, against Lord Middlesex. English lawyer William Bray recorded a game of baseball on Easter Monday 1755 in Guildford, Surrey; Bray's diary was verified as authentic in September 2008. This early form of the game was apparently brought to North America by English immigrants. The first appearance of the term that exists in print was in "A Little Pretty Pocket-Book" in 1744, where it is called Base-Ball.
 American football – can be traced to modified early versions of rugby football played in England and Canadian football mixed with and ultimately changed by American innovations which led over time to the finished version of the game from 1876 to now. The basic set of rules were first developed in American universities in the mid-19th century.
 Golf - Golf originated from Scotland in the 15th century, the first course in Scotland being St Andrews. The first golf course in America was founded by a Scot John Reid in 1888, and was named after the first Scottish golf club Saint Andrew's Golf Club located in Yonkers, New York, from here golf soared as a national hobby, and by the turn of the 20th Century there was more than 1,000 golf courses in North America.

Music 
Another area of cultural influence are American Patriotic songs:
 American National Anthem – takes its melody from the 18th-century English song "To Anacreon in Heaven" written by John Stafford Smith for the Anacreontic Society, a men's social club in London and lyrics written by American Francis Scott Key. This became a well-known and recognized patriotic song throughout the United States, which was officially designated as the American national anthem in 1931.
Before 1931, other songs served as the hymns of American officialdom.

 Amazing Grace – written by English poet and clergyman John Newton. Popular among African Americans, it became an icon in American culture and has been used for a variety of secular purposes and marketing campaigns.
 Hail, Columbia – initial presidential inauguration song up until early 20th century. Now used for the Vice President.
 Battle Hymn of the Republic – Patriotic song sung during the civil war time between 1861 and 1865.

Admixture in non-Latino whites 

Some white Americans have varying amounts of Amerindian and sub-Saharan African ancestry. In a recent study, Gonçalves et al. 2007 reported sub-Saharan and Amerindian mtDna lineages at a frequency of 3.1% (respectively 0.9% and 2.2%) in European Americans, although that frequency may be scattered by region.

DNA analysis on white Americans by geneticist Mark D. Shriver showed an average of 0.7% Sub-Saharan African admixture and 3.2% Native American admixture. The same author, in another study, claimed that about 30% of all White Americans, approximately 66 million people, have a median of 2.3% of Sub-Saharan African admixture. Later, Shriver retracted his statement, saying that actually around 5% of White Americans exhibit some detectable level of African ancestry.

From the 23andMe database, about 5 to at least 13 percent of self-identified white American Southerners have greater than 1 percent African ancestry. Southern states with the highest African American populations tended to have the highest percentages of hidden African ancestry. White Americans (European Americans) on average are: "98.6 percent European, 0.19 percent African and 0.18 percent Native American." Inferred British/Irish ancestry is found in European Americans from all states at mean proportions of
above 20%, and represents a majority of ancestry, above 50% mean proportion, in states such
as Mississippi, Arkansas, and Tennessee. Scandinavian
ancestry in European Americans is highly localized; most states show only trace mean
proportions of Scandinavian ancestry, while it comprises a significant proportion, upwards of
10%, of ancestry in European Americans from Minnesota and the Dakotas.

See also 

 American ancestry
 Anglo
 Ethnic groups in Europe
 European Canadians
 European Oceanians
 Immigration to the United States
 Melting pot
 Non-Latino whites
 Stereotypes of white Americans
 White Americans
 White Anglo-Saxon Protestant
 White ethnic
 White Latino Americans
 White Southerners
 Romani Americans
 American Jews
 European Mexicans
 White Americans in California
 White Latin Americans
 Colonial history of the United States
 Hispanic and Latino Americans
 White demographic decline

Notes

References

External links

 
 
European-American culture
European diaspora in North America
Ethnic groups in the United States
Transatlantic cultural exchange
Transatlantic relations